Remembrance Nyathi (born 10 December 1986) is a Zimbabwean cricketer. He made his first-class debut for Centrals cricket team in the 2006–07 Logan Cup on 12 April 2007. In December 2020, he was selected to play for the Rhinos in the 2020–21 Logan Cup.

References

External links
 

1986 births
Living people
Zimbabwean cricketers
Centrals cricketers
Midlands cricketers
Mid West Rhinos cricketers
Sportspeople from Bulawayo